Want ad may refer to:
 Want Ads, a song by Honey Cone
 Classified advertising
 Internet bulletin board
 Personal advertisement